Bertrand Marie de Lesseps (3 February 1875 – 28 August 1918) was a French fencer. He competed in the individual and team sabre events at the 1908 Summer Olympics. He was killed in action during World War I. He was the brother of Ismaël de Lesseps, and son of Ferdinand de Lesseps.

See also
 List of Olympians killed in World War I

References

External links
 

1875 births
1918 deaths
French male sabre fencers
Olympic fencers of France
Fencers at the 1908 Summer Olympics
Counts of France
Bertrand
Fencers from Paris
French military personnel killed in World War I